Anastathes nigricornis is a species of beetle in the family Cerambycidae. It was described by Thomson in 1865. It is known from China, Malaysia, Java, Indonesia and Vietnam.

References

Astathini
Beetles described in 1865